Oak Hill is an unincorporated community in Rusk County, located in the U.S. state of Texas. According to the Handbook of Texas, the community had a population of 24 in 2000. It is located within the Longview, Texas metropolitan area.

Demographics
Oak Hill's population ranged from 10 in the 1930s to 80 in the 1940s and then 100 in the 1950s to 1960s, then dropped to 24 from the early 1970s through 2000.

Geography

Education
Today, the community is served by the Henderson Independent School District.

Notes

Unincorporated communities in Cherokee County, Texas
Unincorporated communities in Texas